Flight is a 2012 American drama film directed by Robert Zemeckis, written by John Gatins and produced by Walter F. Parkes, Laurie MacDonald, Steve Starkey, Zemeckis, and Jack Rapke. Loosely inspired by the plane crash of Alaska Airlines Flight 261, the film stars Denzel Washington as William "Whip" Whitaker Sr., an alcoholic airline pilot who miraculously crash-lands his plane after a mechanical failure, saving nearly everyone on board. Although hailed a hero, an investigation soon begins to cast the captain in a different light.

Flight premiered at the New York Film Festival on October 14, 2012, and was theatrically released the following month on November 2. It received generally positive reviews from critics, who praised Washington's performance and Zemeckis' return to live-action filmmaking, his first such film since Cast Away and What Lies Beneath in 2000. The film was also a commercial success, grossing $161.8 million against a production budget of $31 million. Flight appeared on multiple critics' year-end top ten lists and received two nominations at the 85th Academy Awards for Best Actor (Washington) and Best Original Screenplay (Gatins).

Plot

Airline pilot Captain Whip Whitaker uses cocaine to stay alert after a sleepless night in his Orlando hotel room. He pilots SouthJet Flight 227 to Atlanta, which experiences severe turbulence at takeoff. Co-pilot Ken Evans takes over while Whip discreetly mixes vodka in his orange juice and takes a nap. He is jolted awake as the plane goes into a steep dive. Unable to regain control, Whip is forced to make a controlled crash landing in an open field, hitting his head and losing consciousness on impact.

Whip awakens in an Atlanta hospital with moderate injuries and is greeted by his old friend Charlie Anderson, who represents the airline's pilots union. He tells Whip that he managed to save 96 out of 102, losing two crew members and four passengers, but mentions his co-pilot is in a coma. Whip sneaks away for a cigarette and meets Nicole Maggen, a heroin addict recovering from an overdose in the same hospital. The next morning, his friend and drug dealer Harling Mays picks him up from the hospital.

Having retired to his late father's farm, Whip meets Charlie and attorney Hugh Lang, who explain that the National Transportation Safety Board (NTSB) performed a drug test while he was unconscious. Results showed that Whip was intoxicated during the flight, although Hugh gets the toxicology report voided on technical grounds. Whip visits and becomes intimate with Nicole, but his drinking habits clash with Nicole's attempts to stay drug-free. Later, he attends a funeral for Katerina, a flight attendant who died in the crash, and with whom Whip had spent the night before the incident. He sees a surviving crew member, Margaret, and asks her to tell the NTSB that he was sober.

Whip pays a visit to his co-pilot Ken Evans after he awakens from his coma. Evans has likely lost much of his ability to walk and may never pilot an airplane again. Although upset, Evans has no intention of telling the NTSB that Whip was drinking. Nicole decides to separate from Whip after he fails to stay sober and he spontaneously drives to the home of his ex-wife and son, both of whom resent him. Hounded by the media, he stays with Charlie until the NTSB hearing, vowing not to drink. The night before the hearing, Charlie and Hugh move Whip to a guarded hotel room with no alcohol. He finds the door to an adjacent room unlocked and raids the minibar there.

The next morning, Charlie discovers Whip passed out drunk. Whip and Charlie call Harling to provide Whip with cocaine, hoping to get him alert enough to make it through the hearing. At the hearing, lead NTSB investigator Ellen Block explains that a damaged elevator assembly jackscrew was the primary cause of the crash. She commends Whip on his valor and skill, noting that no other pilot was able to land the plane in simulations of the crash. She then reveals that two empty vodka bottles were found in the plane's trash, despite beverages not being served to passengers, and that Whip's blood test was excluded for technical reasons. She then states the only other member of the crew to test positive for alcohol was Katerina. Whip pauses, unable to bring himself to blame Katerina for his actions. He collects himself and comes clean, admitting to being intoxicated the day of the crash. A tearful Whip also admits that he is presently drunk and has a problem, coming to terms with his alcoholism. 

Thirteen months later, an imprisoned Whip is lecturing a support group of fellow inmates telling them he is glad to be sober and doesn't regret doing the right thing. He is also working to rebuild his relationship with his son, who visits to interview Whip for a college application essay titled "The most fascinating person that I've never met". He begins by asking, "Who are you?" As a plane flies overhead, Whip replies, "That's a good question."

Cast

 Denzel Washington as Captain William "Whip" Whitaker
 Don Cheadle as Hugh Lang
 Kelly Reilly as Nicole
 Bruce Greenwood as Charlie Anderson
 John Goodman as Harling Mays
 Melissa Leo as Ellen Block
 Tamara Tunie as Margaret Thomason
 Nadine Velazquez as Katerina Marquez
 Brian Geraghty as First Officer Ken Evans
 Peter Gerety as Avington Carr
 Garcelle Beauvais as Deana Coleman
Boni Yanagisawa as Camelia Satou
 Justin Martin as Will
 James Badge Dale as Gaunt Young Man
 Piers Morgan as Himself
 E. Roger Mitchell as Craig Matson
 Sarah Clark as Radio Talk Show Host (voice)
 Vinnie Hasson as Radio Talk Show Host (voice)
 Randy Thom as Radio Stock Market Reporter (voice)
 Dennis P. Wise as Air Traffic Controller (voice)
 Paul Volle as Air Traffic Controller (voice)
 Hal Williams as Whip's Dad (voice)
 Kwesi Boakye as Young Will (voice)

Production
Zemeckis entered negotiations to direct Flight in April 2011, and by early June had accepted, with Denzel Washington about to finalize his own deal. It was the first time that Zemeckis and Washington had worked together on a motion picture.

By mid-September 2011, Kelly Reilly was in negotiations to play the female lead, with Don Cheadle, Bruce Greenwood, and John Goodman joining later in the month, and Melissa Leo and James Badge Dale in final negotiations. Screenwriter John Gatins said in early October 2011 that production would begin mid-month. Flight was largely filmed on location near Atlanta, Georgia over 45 days in November 2011. The film was produced with a relatively small budget of $31 million, which Zemeckis calculated to be his smallest in inflation-adjusted dollars since 1980, made possible because of tax rebates from Georgia and because Zemeckis and Washington waived their customary fees.

Gatins explained in a 2012 interview with the Los Angeles Times that the dramatic fictional crash depicted in Flight was "loosely inspired" by the 2000 crash of Alaska Airlines Flight 261, which was caused by a broken jackscrew. In that incident, an ungreased jackscrew came loose and caused a catastrophic failure from which recovery was impossible, though pilot Ted Thompson and first officer Bill Tansky were able to fly the plane inverted in the last moments of the flight. Among the captain's last words on the CVR were:

The Alaska Airlines 261 crash had no survivors. The airplane in Flight, a two-engine T-tail jet airliner, appears to be from the same model family as was the plane involved in the Alaska Airlines 261 disaster, a variant of the MD-80. Many elements from the accident were used in the film, such as the cause of the accident, segments of the radio communication, and the inversion of the airplane.

Scroggins Aviation Mockup & Effects was hired to supply three decommissioned MD-80 series aircraft that represented the plane in the film, with additional MD-80-series aircraft used for scenes in the cabin and cockpit.

Reception

Release
Flight opened in 1,884 theaters across the US and Canada on November 2, 2012.

Critical response

Flight received mostly positive reviews, and has an approval rating of 78% based on a sample of 236 critics on Rotten Tomatoes, with a weighted average of 6.90/10. The site's consensus states "Robert Zemeckis makes a triumphant return to live-action cinema with Flight, a thoughtful and provocative character study propelled by a compelling performance from Denzel Washington". Metacritic gives the film a weighted average score of 76 out of 100 based on reviews from 40 critics. Audiences polled by CinemaScore gave the film an average grade of "A-" on an A+ to F scale.

Washington's performance received praise. The Hollywood Reporter'''s Todd McCarthy wrote that the film "provides Denzel Washington with one of his meatiest, most complex roles, and he flies with it". Roger Ebert of the Chicago Sun-Times gave the film four out of four, writing "Flight segues into a brave and tortured performance by Denzel Washington—one of his very best. Not often does a movie character make such a harrowing personal journey that keeps us in deep sympathy all of the way." He also noted the plane's upside-down flight scene was "one of the most terrifying flight scenes I've ever witnessed" and called the film "nearly flawless". Ebert went on to name the film the sixth best of 2012. Although the film was not nominated for Best Picture, he later noted that it deserved to be. Entertainment Weekly wrote, "Denzel Washington didn't get an Oscar nod for nothing: His performance as an alcoholic airline pilot ensnared by his own heroics is crash-and-burn epic".

The film received some criticism from pilots who questioned its realism, particularly the premise of a pilot being able to continue flying with a significant substance-abuse problem. The Air Line Pilots' Association dismissed the film as an inaccurate portrayal of an air crew and stated that "we all enjoy being entertained, but a thrilling tale should not be mistaken for the true story of extraordinary safety and professionalism among airline pilots". Airline pilot Patrick Smith also commented that "a real-life Whitaker wouldn't survive two minutes at an airline, and all commercial pilots—including, if not especially, those who've dealt with drug or alcohol addiction—should feel slandered by his ugly caricature". The pilot also criticised the portrayal of the relationship between copilot and captain, the decision of Whitaker to increase speed dangerously in a storm, and the ultimate dive and crash landing of Whitaker's aircraft.

Top ten listsFlight was featured on 47 top ten lists by North American critics.
 3rd – Steven Rea, Philadelphia Inquirer 3rd – Rafer Guzmán, Newsday 6th – Roger Ebert, Chicago Sun-Times 7th – Richard Roeper, RichardRoeper.com
 7th – Kyle Smith, New York Post 8th – Brian Tallerico, Hollywood Chicago
 9th – Michael Phillips, Chicago Tribune 9th – Owen Gleiberman, Entertainment Weekly''

Awards and nominations

See also
 Alaska Airlines Flight 261
 The Pilot (1980 film)

References

External links

 
 

2012 films
2012 drama films
American aviation films
American disaster films
American drama films
2010s English-language films
Films scored by Alan Silvestri
Films about alcoholism
Films about drugs
Films about prostitution in the United States
Films about aviation accidents or incidents
Films directed by Robert Zemeckis
Films set on airplanes
Films set in Florida
Films set in Atlanta
Films shot in Georgia (U.S. state)
ImageMovers films
Paramount Pictures films
Films with screenplays by John Gatins
Films produced by Walter F. Parkes
Films produced by Robert Zemeckis
2010s American films